Hochkopf may refer to:

 Hochkopf (Northern Black Forest), a mountain in the Black Forest, Germany
 Hochkopf (Southern Black Forest), a wooded ridge in the Black Forest, Germany